Beni Mellal is a city in north-central Morocco. It is the capital of the Béni Mellal-Khénifra Region and has a population of 192,676 (2014 census). It sits at the foot of Jbel Tassemit (2247 m), next to the plains of Beni Amir.

The walls of the city go back to Moulay Ismail, in 1688, as well as the Kasbah Bel-Kush but most of the city is quite modern and forms an important economic centre for the region, particularly in the areas of petrochemical production as well as textile manufacturing, which forms the backbone of the wider community. Local agricultural products as oranges, olives and figs find their way to the market via Beni Mellal.

The city has good connections via the road to Casablanca to the East and lies on the ancient route - now a national highway - from Fez to Marrakech. The national rail-operator ONCF is also extending the railtrack from Casablanca to (nearby) Oued Zem to the city.

History

The city was first called Ismali back in 1688, since Moulay Ismail, the second ruler of the Moroccan Alaouite Dynasty, built the fortresses of Tadla (remains still visible today). The ruler also constructed the well known Kasba Ras el Ain of this area, which overlooks the whole city along with the agricultural surroundings. It is made from stone and is close to the spring of Ain Asserdoun. The Kasbah was believed to have been built in order to protect this spring and the surrounding area. The spring of Ain Asserdoun is a Berber name meaning the source of the mule or the eye of the mule. In the area of Soumaa a zaouia exists dating from the 16th century, which is still used for religious purposes. It was the meeting of these two cities, Tadla and Soumaa, which formed the Berber name Beni Mellal which translated means children of the white.

Climate

Beni Mellal has a hot semi-arid climate (Köppen climate classification BSh) with very hot summers and cool winters. As the city lies quite far inland and is shielded by the Middle Atlas mountains, the climate is highly continental. Because of these factors the overall climate can be considered in a fluctuative state generally moderating between two larger extremes in temperature and climate.

Transport

Beni Mellal is served by Beni Mellal Airport.

Education 

In Beni Mellal is located Sultan Moulay Slimane University.

Notable people 
Abde Ezzalzouli - Professional footballer 
Hicham Sigueni - Long-distance runner 
Mohamed El Badraoui - Former footballer

Gallery

References

External links 
 Lexicorient 
 Monographie de la Ville de Beni Mellal 

Populated places in Béni Mellal Province
Municipalities of Morocco
Beni Mellal
Regional capitals in Morocco